Blue Kentucky Girl  may refer to:
Blue Kentucky Girl (Emmylou Harris album), 1979
Blue Kentucky Girl (Loretta Lynn album), 1965
 "Blue Kentucky Girl" (song), a 1965 song by Loretta Lynn